Iván Ramírez (born 23 February 1990) is an Argentine professional footballer who plays as a midfielder for Belgrano.

Career
Ramírez's career began in 2012 with Fénix, he made his professional bow in Primera B Metropolitana on 12 August against Temperley; though he had featured twenty-eight times and scored once in Primera C Metropolitana in the season prior. Ramírez joined Deportivo Español on 30 June 2014, subsequently featuring in fifty-two matches across 2014 and 2015. Primera C Metropolitana side San Miguel signed Ramírez in January 2016, which preceded a move to Flandria in August 2017. His first appearance arrived versus Agropecuario on 24 September, which was the first of twenty-one appearances in 2017–18 as Flandria finished 24th.

On 11 July 2018, after Flandria were relegated to Primera B Metropolitana, Ramírez was loaned to Almagro of Primera B Nacional.

Career statistics
.

References

External links

1990 births
Living people
People from Malvinas Argentinas Partido
Argentine footballers
Association football midfielders
Sportspeople from Buenos Aires Province
Primera C Metropolitana players
Primera B Metropolitana players
Primera Nacional players
Club Atlético Fénix players
Deportivo Español footballers
Club Atlético San Miguel footballers
Flandria footballers
Club Almagro players
Gimnasia y Esgrima de Mendoza footballers
Central Córdoba de Santiago del Estero footballers
Club Atlético Belgrano footballers